Bahurani is a 1989 family-drama Indian Hindi film directed by Manik Chatterjee and produced by Mohan Lalwani and Prem Lawani. It starred Rekha, Rakesh Roshan, Utpal Dutt, Usha Kiran, Deven Verma in lead roles. Music for the film was scored by R. D. Burman.

Plot 
Amit is a modern guy, raised in Bombay (present-day Mumbai) and educated in USA. He wants to marry a compatible woman who is educated like him and shares his views. To  the contrary, his parents fix his marriage with a beautiful, intelligent and traditional village girl, Madhuri. Amit tries to reject but his father adamantly demands that he should marry Madhuri or leave the house. Having no choice, Amit waits for an opportunity.

Madhuri lives along with her widowed mother and her brother Shrikant. Shrikant comes to Amit's house before marriage and Amit's father demands dowry in the form of gold just to make fun of him. He takes that seriously and thinking that the wedding will not take place if he can't get the gold, gets fake jewellery. During the wedding ceremony, Amit observes that and takes that opportunity to reject the bride despite the fact that the wedding has already taken place and Madhuri is his wife now. Amit's parents request Madhuri to wait for some time for Amit to correct his behavior.

But after a year, still Amit wouldn't come back to take Madhuri to her in-laws house. Madhuri wants to get a job in Bombay and goes to an interview. There, she learns that Amit is the boss and is hired anyway. She changes her name to Malathi Choudhury and as Amit hasn't seen her face previously, doesn't recognize her. He develops feelings for Malathi and later she reciprocates them. He wants to marry her, hiding the fact that he is married.

Amit's parents still waiting for Madhuri, learn about Malathi and try to confront her. They recognize Madhuri and want to continue the game. At last, Madhuri's mother reveals Malathi's real identity to Amit and he plays a little drama too. At last, Amit asks for forgiveness and invites Madhuri as daughter-in-law to his house.

Cast 
 Rekha as Madhuri / Malti 
 Rakesh Roshan as Amit Chaudhary
 Utpal Dutt as Sadanand Chaudhary
 Usha Kiran as Laxmi Chaudhary
 Deven Verma as Kumar Chatterjee
 Urmila Bhatt as Madhuri's mother
 Rakesh Bedi as Shrikant

Music

References

External links 
 
 

1980s Hindi-language films
Indian drama films
Films scored by R. D. Burman
1989 crime drama films
1989 films
Hindi-language drama films